The 2012–13 NJIT Highlanders men's basketball team represented New Jersey Institute of Technology during the 2012–13 NCAA Division I men's basketball season. The Highlanders, led by fifth year head coach Jim Engles, played their home games at the Fleisher Center and were members of the Great West Conference. They finished the season 16–13, 6–2 in Great West play to win the regular season conference championship. They lost in the semifinals of the Great West tournament to Houston Baptist.

This was their final year as a member of the Great West as the conference was disbanded when most of its members joined different conference beginning in the 2013–14 season. NJIT was unable to find conference membership and became the only Division I men's basketball independent for 2013–14.

Roster

Schedule and results

|-
!colspan=9| Regular season

|-
!colspan=9| 2013 Great West Conference men's basketball tournament

References

NJIT Highlanders men's basketball seasons
NJIT